Hillman's Airways was a 1930s British airline that later became part of British Airways.

The company was formed in November 1931 as Hillman's Saloon Coaches and Airways Limited by Edward Henry Hillman who was a coach operator in Essex. His previous business had been sold to London Transport following a change in government rules on the expansion of bus routes. The airline's first service was a charter flight on 25 December 1931. 
It started a scheduled service on 1 April 1932 between Romford and Clacton using a de Havilland Puss Moth and a de Havilland Fox Moth; with a fare of £1 return it was operated every three hours due to the popularity. A de Havilland Dragon was bought to operate an international service between Romford and Paris le Bourget.

From 1 December 1934, the airline was given a contract to fly air mail between London, Liverpool, Glasgow and Belfast formerly operated by the Railway Air Services. Following the award of the contract Hillman changed the legal name from Hillman's Airways Limited to Edward Henry Hillman Limited and the airline extended its services to continental Europe, including Ostend and Brussels. On 1 June 1934 the airline moved its operating base to Stapleford Aerodrome.

Just before Hillman died, on 31 December 1934, aged 45, the company became a public company, although within a year it had been merged with Spartan Airlines and United Airways to form British Airways.

Accidents and incidents
On 2 October 1934, de Havilland Dragon Rapide G-ACPM crashed into the sea off Folkestone causing the death of the pilot and the six passengers.
On 26 January 1935, de Havilland Dragon Rapide G-ACPO, operating a mail flight from Aldergrove Airport, Belfast to Stapleford Aerodrome, Abridge, Essex via Speke Airport, Liverpool, Lancashire crashed at Derbyhaven, Isle of Man, whilst attempting to divert to Ronaldsway Airport during bad weather.
On 21 February 1935, two American sisters, Jane and Elizabeth Du Bois, jumped from a Hillman's Airways de Havilland Dragon en route from Stapleford Aerodrome, Essex, to Paris. They were the only passengers, having bought all the seats on the aircraft, but claiming before take-off that their companions could not travel that day. Their bodies were found on waste ground in Upminster, but the pilot only became aware of what had happened some time later when over the English Channel. The women were the daughters of the American Consul in Naples, Court Du Bois. The women had been well-known society figures and press speculation linked their double suicide with the recent deaths of two R.A.F. pilots whom they had been romantically linked to. The pilots had been both killed in the crash of a Short Singapore flying boat near Messina, Italy less than a week before.

Fleet
 de Havilland Dragon (6)
 de Havilland Dragon Rapide (8)
 de Havilland Express (3)
 de Havilland Fox Moth
 de Havilland Puss Moth

See also
 List of defunct airlines of the United Kingdom

References

Notes

Bibliography

Doyle, Neville. 2002. The Triple Alliance: The Predecessors of the first British Airways. Air-Britain. 
Moss, Peter W. October 1974. British Airways. Aeroplane Monthly.
Pirie, G.H. 2009. Air Empire: British Imperial Civil Aviation 1919-39. Manchester University Press 

 
Defunct airlines of the United Kingdom
Airlines established in 1931
Airlines disestablished in 1935
1931 establishments in England
1935 disestablishments in England
1935 mergers and acquisitions